Yordan Penev (born 25 Мау 1988) is a Bulgarian former footballer.

Penev made his professional debut in a Bulgarian Cup match on 12 November 2008.

References

1988 births
Living people
Bulgarian footballers
First Professional Football League (Bulgaria) players
PFC Spartak Varna players

Association football midfielders